Prince Félix of Luxembourg (Félix Léopold Marie Guillaume; born 3 June 1984) is the second son of Henri, Grand Duke of Luxembourg, and Maria Teresa, Grand Duchess of Luxembourg. He is currently third in the line of succession.

Early life and education

Prince Félix was born on 3 June 1984 at the Grand Duchess Charlotte Maternity Hospital in Luxembourg. He is the second of the five children of Grand Duke Henri and Grand Duchess Maria Teresa, the others being: Hereditary Grand Duke Guillaume, Prince Louis, Princess Alexandra and Prince Sébastien. His godparents are Prince Jean and Catalina Mestre. He was named after his great-grandfather, Prince Felix of Bourbon-Parma.

Prince Félix attended Lorentzweiler for his primary school and the Notre Dame Sainte-Sophie of Luxembourg, then the "American School of Luxembourg" for secondary schooling.

He attended the International School of Luxembourg and in 1998 he joined the Swiss boarding school Collège Alpin International Beau Soleil in Villars-sur-Ollon, Switzerland. After completing high school with honours, he joined the Royal Military Academy Sandhurst in Britain; however, due to a serious knee injury, he had to leave the programme early. Between 2003 and 2004, Prince Félix took interest in different fields of study such as political science, psychology and communication, leading him to attend schools in England and Belgium. He has also completed courses at various companies in order to obtain additional professional experience.

In 2005, Prince Félix joined the Marketing and Public Relations department of Grand Chelem Management SA, a Swiss company specializing in the organisation of sporting and cultural events. He continues to work as an independent consultant for the company. The prince takes a particular interest in ethics in biotechnology. In June 2009, the Grand Ducal Court announced later that October, Prince Félix would begin a bachelor's degree in bioethics at the Pontifical Athenaeum Regina Apostolorum in Rome, Italy.

In addition to Luxembourgish, French, German, he is fluent in English, Spanish, and Italian.

Personal interests
In 2003, he accepted the patronage of the sports association paratrooper "Cercle Para Luxembourg" (FAL). A fan of basketball, he was appointed honorary president of the "Federation Luxembourg Basketball" in 2005.

Since 2016, Prince Félix chairs the Lorgues Terre de Vins association, whose goal is to make their community an unmissable destination in Provence.

Marriage and children
On 13 December 2012, the Grand Ducal household confirmed Prince Félix's engagement to Claire Lademacher. The civil wedding took place on 17 September 2013 in Königstein im Taunus, followed by a religious ceremony on 21 September in the Basilica of Sainte Marie-Madeleine in Saint-Maximin-la-Sainte-Baume, France. Since the wedding, the couple have been living in the south of France at the Château Les Crostes, a winery in Lorgues that has been owned by the Lademacher family for many years.

Prince Félix and Princess Claire's daughter, Princess Amalia Gabriela Maria Theresa, was born on 15 June 2014 at the Maternité Grande-Duchesse Charlotte Hospital in Luxembourg. A son, Prince Liam Henri Hartmut, was born at Private Clinic in Geneva on 28 November 2016.

Honours and awards

National honours
:
 Knight of the Order of the Gold Lion of the House of Nassau
 Grand Cross of Order of Adolphe of Nassau

Notes

External links

 Official website

House of Luxembourg-Nassau
1984 births
Living people
Luxembourgian people of Cuban descent
Luxembourgian princes
Princes of Bourbon-Parma
People from Luxembourg City
People from Geneva
Sons of monarchs
Collège Alpin International Beau Soleil alumni